Victor Guilherme dos Santos Carvalho (born 10 May 1993), commonly known as Vitinho, is a Brazilian footballer who plays as a winger for Liga 1 club PSIS Semarang.

Career statistics

Club

References

External links
 Vitinho at Soccerway

1993 births
Living people
Brazilian footballers
Brazilian expatriate footballers
Association football forwards
II liga players
Campeonato Brasileiro Série D players
Liga Portugal 2 players
Volta Redonda FC players
Fluminense FC players
Esporte Clube Tigres do Brasil players
Ceilândia Esporte Clube players
Raków Częstochowa players
Associação Atlética Luziânia players
Eléctrico F.C. players
S.C. Praiense players
SC Mirandela players
F.C. Vizela players
C.D. Cova da Piedade players
U.D. Vilafranquense players
Motor Lublin players
Brazilian expatriate sportspeople in Poland
Expatriate footballers in Poland
Brazilian expatriate sportspeople in Portugal
Expatriate footballers in Portugal
Footballers from Rio de Janeiro (city)